David Puniani is a New Zealand hip-hop performer of Tongan descent from South Auckland, best known as a member of the hip hop group Deceptikonz. He is signed to the Dawn Raid Entertainment music label and in 2009 he was "Best Pacific Male Artist" at the Pacific Music Awards.

Background 
In 2008, his debut single "Somebody" became a top 10 hit on the NZ iTunes top songs for all genres and #1 on NZ iTunes top hip hop downloads. Later that year, his hit single "Too Shy" jumped from #38 to #6 in one week on New Zealand’s RIANZ Top 40 Singles Chart.

In 2009, the pop group The Pussycat Dolls asked Devolo to do a remix of their forthcoming single "Bottle Pop". In 2009 Devolo featured on David Dallas' single "Indulge Me", which charted at #34.  

His debut solo album Heaven & Hell was released on 2 March 2009, but it failed to make the charts.

Discography

Albums

Singles

References

 http://www.dawnraid.co.nz/ Dawn Raid Entertainment Official Website
 https://web.archive.org/web/20110809032916/http://www.rianz.org.nz/rianz/chart.asp RIANZ Official Top 40 Singles Chart

Year of birth missing (living people)
Living people
New Zealand hip hop musicians
Pacific Music Award-winning artists
New Zealand people of Tongan descent
Musicians from Auckland